Blanche Monnier (1 March 1849 – 13 October 1913), often known in France as la Séquestrée de Poitiers (roughly, "The Confined Woman of Poitiers"), was a woman from Poitiers, France, who was secretly kept locked in a small room by her aristocratic mother and brother for 25 years. She was eventually found by police, then middle-aged and in an emaciated and filthy condition; according to officials, Monnier had not seen any sunlight for her entire captivity.

Biography 
Monnier was a French socialite born on March 1, 1849, from a well-respected, conservative bourgeois family of Charles (1820–1882) and Louise Monnier (1825–1901), in Poitiers of old noble origins. She had one older brother named Marcel Monnier (1848–1913). She was renowned for her beauty and attracted many potential suitors for marriage. In 1876, at the age of 27, she desired to marry an older lawyer who was not to her mother's liking; she argued that her daughter could not marry a "penniless lawyer". Her disapproving mother, angered by her daughter's defiance, locked her in a tiny, dark room in the attic of their home, where she kept her secluded for 25 years. Louise and Marcel continued on with their daily lives, pretending to mourn Blanche's disappearance. None of her friends knew where she was and the lawyer whom she wished to marry died unexpectedly in 1885. On 23 May 1901, the "Paris Attorney General" received an anonymous letter, the author of which is still unknown, that revealed the incarceration:

Monnier was rescued by police from appalling conditions, covered in old food and feces, with bugs all around the bed and floor, weighing barely .

One policeman described the state of Monnier and her bed thus:

Her mother was arrested, became ill shortly afterwards and died 15 days later after seeing an angry mob gather in front of her house. Her brother, Marcel Monnier, appeared in court and was initially convicted, but later was acquitted on appeal; he was deemed mentally incapacitated, and, although the judges criticised his choices, they found that a "duty to rescue" did not exist in the penal code at that time with sufficient rule to convict him.

After she was released from the room, Monnier continued to have mental health problems. She was diagnosed with various disorders, including anorexia nervosa, schizophrenia, exhibitionism and coprophilia. This soon led to her admission to a psychiatric hospital in Blois, where she died on October 13, 1913, in apparent obscurity.

Legacy 
In 1930, André Gide published a book about the incident, named La Séquestrée de Poitiers, changing little but the names of the protagonists.

See also 
 Genie: A girl whose father kept her socially isolated until the age of 13 years and 7 months.
 List of kidnappings
 List of solved missing person cases
 List of child abuse cases featuring long-term detention

Notes

References 

English sources

External links 

1849 births
1900s missing person cases
1903 crimes in France
1913 deaths
19th-century French people
19th-century French women
20th-century French people
20th-century French women
Formerly missing people
French people with disabilities
French victims of crime
Kidnapped French people
Missing person cases in France
Place of birth missing
Violence against women in France